Pyrgodesmidae is a family of flat-backed millipedes in the order Polydesmida. The family contains over 200 species distributed in tropics around the world. Some species are found only in ant colonies, and are considered obligate myrmecophiles.

References

Polydesmida
Millipede families
Taxa named by Filippo Silvestri